Sunshine and Rain is the eleventh studio album by American country singer Connie Smith. It was released in October 1968 via RCA Victor and included 12 tracks. Sunshine and Rain featured an assortment of both new material and covers of songs by other country artists. The album reached the top 40 of the American country albums chart and received a favorable review from Billboard magazine following its release.

Background
Connie Smith was at the peak of her career in the mid 1960s with a series of uninterrupted top ten country singles. This was launched with her 1964 debut single, "Once a Day", which topped the country songs chart for eight weeks and brought a string of top ten singles in the years that followed. The RCA label issued ten studio albums of Smith's material between 1965 and 1968. String instrumentation was brought onto her tenth studio album to give it a more country pop sound. This sound would continue with her eleventh album, Sunshine and Rain.

Recording and content
The recording sessions for Sunshine and Rain took place between May 1967 and July 1968 at the RCA Victor Studio in Nashville, Tennessee. The sessions were produced by Bob Ferguson, Smith's longtime producer at RCA Victor. A total of 12 tracks comprised the collection. Several new recordings were part of the album, including two cuts penned by Dallas Frazier: "How Much Lonelier Can Lonely Be" and "Sundown of My Mind". Other new recordings included the Harlan Howard-penned "To Chicago with Love", which featured a spoken recitation by Smith. She also cut Howard's original tune, "The Deepening Snow", which she found at the Tree Publishers songwriting company. The song has since been one of Smith's most requested songs in her catalog. 

The album also featured covers of songs first recorded by other artists. "Nat'chilly Ain't No Good" was composed by Jerry Reed but was first released as a single by his wife, Priscilla Mitchell. Although Smith felt it to be "different from most of what I do", she ultimately told Bob Ferguson that it "would be fun" to record. The album also features a female covers of Glen Campbell's "Gentle on My Mind" and Waylon Jennings's "Only Daddy That'll Walk the Line". Smith recounted only recording the latter song because of a guitar solo performed by Wayne Moss, whom she got to play on her own record. "I did it in a different key than Waylon so that was work for Wayne, but he did it!" Smith also cut Jan Howard's (wife of Harlan Howard) "What Makes a Man Wander".

Release and reception
Sunshine and Rain was originally released in October 1968 on the RCA Victor label. It was the eleventh studio album released in Smith's career and the tenth with RCA Victor. The disc was originally distributed as a vinyl LP, with six songs on either side of the record. Decades later, the album was re-released through Sony Music Entertainment to digital and streaming sites. Following its initial release, Billboard magazine gave the album a positive response in their November 1968 issue. Reviewers praised the "heartbreak" material included on the project and highlighted the tracks "The Hurt Goes On", "How Much Lonelier Can Lonely Be", and "The Deepening Snow". Sunshine and Rain spent ten weeks on the American Billboard Top Country Albums chart, peaking at number 32 in January 1969. It was Smith's lowest peaking album up to that point in her career and her second to miss the top 20.

Track listings

Vinyl version

Digital version

Personnel
All credits are adapted from the liner notes of Sunshine and Rain and the biography booklet by Barry Mazor titled Just for What I Am.

Musical personnel
 Byron Bach – cello
 Brenton Banks – violin
 Howard Carpenter – viola
 Jerry Carrigan – drums
 Dorothy Dillard – background vocals
 Bobby L. Dyson – electric bass
 Ray Edenton – guitar
 Johnny Gimble – fiddle
 Solie Fott – violin
 Buddy Harman – drums
 Russ Hicks – steel guitar
 Priscilla Hubbard – background vocals
 Lillian Hunt – violin
 Charles Justice – fiddle
 Martin Katahn – violin

 John Kline – viola
 Shelly Kurland – violin
 Charlie McCoy – electric bass, harmonica
 Piere Menard – violin
 Weldon Myrick – steel guitar
 Louis Nunley – background vocals
 Dean Porter – guitar
 Hargus "Pig" Robbins – piano
 Connie Smith – lead vocals
 Roby Story – violin
 Gary Vanosdale – viola
 Bill Walker – vibes
 Lamar Watkins – guitar
 Harvey Wolfe – cello
 William Wright – background vocals

Technical personnel
 Jesse Burt – Liner Notes
 Bob Ferguson – Producer
 Jim Malloy – Engineer
 Bill Vandevort – Engineer

Chart performance

Release history

References

Footnotes

Books

 

1968 albums
Albums produced by Bob Ferguson (music)
Connie Smith albums
RCA Victor albums